Vertixe Sonora  is a Spanish chamber ensemble founded in 2010 and specialized in contemporary classical music. It is an independent non-profit organisation functioning both as a platform which supports the creation and dissemination of New Music and as a music ensemble. Its artistic director since its founding has been the composer Ramón Souto. Their work has been shown in several documentary film as Correspondencias Sonoras (2013) by Manuel del Río,

History 
The group appeared in 2010 as a flexible collective of soloists who specialize in contemporary classical music.

Repertory 
The wide repertory of Vertixe Sonora mainly comprises pieces written specifically for them. Some of the composers who have collaborated with the ensemble are Ramón Souto, Santiago Díez Fischer, Fernando Garnero, Germán Alonso, Bernardo Barros, Stefan Beyer, Charles-Antoine Fréchette, Takuto Fukuda, Jacobo Gaspar, Víctor Ibarra, Esaias Järnegard, Alexander Khubeev, Matthias Kranebitter, Dmitri Kourliandski, Michelle Lou, Miguel Matamoro, Simone Movio, Abel Paul, Marek Poliks, Stefan Prins, Santiago Quintáns, Lula Romero, Elena Rykova, Benjamin Scheuer, Sabrina Schroeder, Sergio Blardony, Nadir Vassena, González Compeán, Hernández Ramos, and Mauricio Pauly.

Members 

 Roberto Alonso / Mario Peris, violin
 Adriana Aranda / Maribeth Diggle, voice
 Rubén Barros / Nuno Marques, electric guitar
 Jesús Coello, bassoon
 Pablo Coello, saxophones and music direction
 David Durán / Haruna Takebe, piano
 Ángel Faraldo / Iván Ferrer-Orozco, electronics
 Pilar Fontalba, oboe
 Aglaya González / Alfonso Noriega, viola
 Carlos Méndez / Kathryn Schulmeister, double bass
 María Mogas, accordion
 Felipe Agell / Carlos Gálvez / Hugo Queirós / Jorge López / Daniel Veiga, clarinets
 Sérgio Pacheco, trumpet
 Thomas Piel / Ailsa Lewin, violoncello
 Iago Ríos, trombone
 Clara Saleiro, flutes
 Diego Ventoso, percussion

Discography 
 2016 - XXVII Premio Jóvenes Compositores. Fundación SGAE-CNDM. Pedro Amaral, conductor
 2019 - Lula Romero: ins Offene. Wergo
 2020 - Víctor Ibarra: The Dimension of the Fragile - Works for Ensemble. Nacho de Paz, conductor. NEOS

Documentaries 
 2013 - Correspondencias Sonoras. Manuel del Río
 2014 - son[UT]opías. CampUSCulturae
 2020 - Enrique X. Macías. A lira do deserto. Manuel del Río

ISCM - Spain 
Since 2021, Vertixe Sonora is the Spanish Section of the International Society for Contemporary Music (ISCM). That  is the return of Spanish representation at the ISCM after several years. An important aspect of the organisation's role is to convene an annual jury to select Spanish works that will be considered for performance at the ISCM's World Music Days festival.

References

External links
 Vertixe's website.
   Vertixe at CNDM.
 Full documentary film from sonUTopías 2013.

Contemporary classical music ensembles
Spanish orchestras
Musical groups established in 2010
2010 establishments in Spain